Alexander Hug (born 29 August 1984) is a German international rugby union player, playing for the TSV Handschuhsheim in the Rugby-Bundesliga and the German national rugby union team.

He made his debut for Germany in a friendly against Switzerland on 29 September 2007.

Honours

Club
 German rugby union cup
 Runners up: 2009

Stats
Alexander Hug's personal statistics in club and international rugby:

Club

 As of 30 April 2012

National team

European Nations Cup

Friendlies & other competitions

 As of 28 April 2013

References

External links
 Alexander Hug at scrum.com
   Alexander Hug at totalrugby.de
  Alexander Hug at the DRV website

1984 births
Living people
German rugby union players
Germany international rugby union players
RG Heidelberg players
TSV Handschuhsheim players
Rugby union flankers